Piletocera nudicornis is a moth in the family Crambidae. It was described by George Hampson in 1897. It is found in India.

References

N
Endemic fauna of India
Moths of Asia
Moths described in 1897